Rivotra is a genus of moths in the subfamily Lymantriinae. The genus was erected by Paul Griveaud in 1976.

Species
Rivotra chalcocrata (Collenette, 1931)
Rivotra confusa Griveaud, 1977
Rivotra mantsaroa Griveaud, 1977
Rivotra perissa (Collenette, 1959)
Rivotra tsaratanana Griveaud, 1977
Rivotra viridipicta (Kenrick, 1914)
Rivotra zonobathra (Collenette, 1936)

References

Lymantriinae